Air Chief Marshal Sir Allan Grant "Angus" Houston,  (born 9 June 1947) is a retired senior officer of the Royal Australian Air Force. He served as Chief of Air Force from 20 June 2001 and then as the Chief of the Defence Force from 4 July 2005. He retired from the military on 3 July 2011.

Since then Houston has been appointed to a number of positions, including chairman of Airservices Australia. In March 2014 he was appointed to head the Joint Agency Coordination Centre during the search for Malaysia Airlines Flight 370, and in the Australia Day Honours of 2015, he was knighted for this service.

Early life
Houston was born on 9 June 1947 in Ayrshire, Scotland and educated at Strathallan School in Forgandenny, Perthshire. He emigrated to Australia in 1968 to work as a jackaroo on a sheep and wheat farm near the town of Mukinbudin in the North Eastern Wheatbelt region of Western Australia.

Service career

Early career
Houston joined the RAAF as a cadet pilot in 1970 and was soon given the nickname "Angus". On 20 March 1971, he was granted an eight-year short-service commission with the rank of pilot officer, and was promoted to flying officer on 20 March 1973. He spent the early part of his career flying UH-1 Iroquois helicopters in various parts of Australia, Papua New Guinea and Indonesia. On 10 March 1975, he received a permanent commission, with a promotion to flight lieutenant on 20 September.

After graduation from Flying Instructors Course in 1975, Houston completed several instructional tours on Macchi MB-326H, British Aircraft Corporation Strikemaster and Iroquois aircraft. A posting to the Republic of Singapore Air Force (RSAF) from 1976 to 1978 was followed by two years at No. 9 Squadron at RAAF Base Amberley. In late 1979, Houston was posted to Hill Air Force Base, Utah U.S.A. for exchange flying duties with a United States Air Force helicopter unit.

In 1980 he was awarded the Air Force Cross for an open sea rescue in gale-force winds off the coast of New South Wales in 1979. He was promoted to squadron leader on 1 January 1982.

After a further posting to No. 9 Squadron as the Executive Officer, and staff training at RAAF Staff College, Houston was posted to the Department of Air (Development Division) where he was involved in the Black Hawk helicopter Project. In 1987, Houston assumed command of No. 9 Squadron to introduce the Black Hawk helicopter, to relocate the unit from Amberley to Townsville, Queensland, and to transfer the capability to the Australian Army. In 1989 he served one year in command of the 5th Aviation Regiment. Houston was admitted as a Member of the Order of Australia in 1990 for his work in the transfer of responsibility for Blackhawk operations.

Following graduation from Joint Services Staff College, Houston was posted to the Joint Operations staff at Headquarters Australian Defence Force and was involved in strategic planning during the Persian Gulf War of 1990–1991.

On promotion to group captain in July 1992, he assumed the post of Director Air Force Policy and negotiated the establishment of the RSAF Flying School at RAAF Base Pearce. After completing a C-130H Hercules conversion in 1993, Houston commanded No. 86 Wing from 1994 to 1995.

Houston attended the Royal College of Defence Studies in London in 1996. He was Chief of Staff, Headquarters Australian Theatre from 1997 to 1999, Commander Integrated Air Defence System from 1999 to 2000 and Head Strategic Command from 17 August 2000.

Senior command
Houston was appointed as Chief of Air Force (CAF) on 20 June 2001 and, in the 2003 Australia Day Honours, advanced to Officer of the Order of Australia. As acting Chief of the Defence Force (CDF) in 2001, Houston played a central role in the Children Overboard Affair. At a Senate inquiry in February 2002, Houston challenged the then government's claim made during the 2001 election campaign, that seafaring asylum seekers had thrown children overboard in a presumed ploy to secure rescue and passage to Australia.

On 4 July 2005, he was promoted to air chief marshal and appointed Chief of the Defence Force. In the Australia Day Honours of 26 January 2008, he was advanced to a Companion of the Order of Australia. In March 2008, Houston's appointment was extended to 3 July 2011.

Later life
After his retirement from the CDF position, the Australian Government appointed Houston as Chair of the Anzac Centenary Advisory Board on 6 July 2011, with the remit to "provide strategic advice and recommendations on the planning and implementation of Anzac Centenary events". On 6 December 2011, it was announced that the Australian Government had appointed Houston as the next chairman of Airservices Australia on the grounds of his aviation, governance and leadership experience.

In June 2012, Prime Minister Julia Gillard announced that Houston would chair an expert group that would examine asylum seeker policy and prepare a report recommending a solution for the Government's consideration.

In February 2014, Houston was appointed chair of the Defence SA Advisory Board. The position was previously held by General Peter Cosgrove.

On 30 March 2014, Prime Minister Tony Abbott announced that Houston will head the Joint Agency Coordination Centre (JACC), based in Perth, formed to oversee the efforts to find Malaysia Airlines Flight 370. At that time, the plane had been missing for just over three weeks since its disappearance on about Saturday, 8 March 2014.

On 26 January 2015, Houston was appointed a Knight of the Order of Australia (AK) for his service to Australia and commitment to the MH17 and MH 370 disasters. Saying he was "surprised and deeply humbled," he said he would prefer to be called by his name instead of "Sir Angus." "It's a great honour to be recognised in this way. But I'd like people to still call me Angus. That's probably the way I am," he said. The ceremony in which he was officially knighted was held on 17 April 2015 at Government House, Canberra by the Governor-General of Australia, General Sir Peter Cosgrove.

On 1 June 2015, Houston was announced as the new special envoy for South Australia. According to Premier Jay Weatherill, Houston is tasked with supporting trade missions, providing advice on international engagement strategies and providing important introductions in key markets. Weatherill also noted Houston's strong relationships with military leaders across Asia being potentially advantageous to the state.

Houston was elected to the role of chancellor of the University of the Sunshine Coast and took office from 1 April 2017.

Houston was appointed to the board of Virgin Australia in December 2018, replacing Mark Vaile.

Houston is an Honorary Patron of the ACT Veterans Rugby Club, the Bomber Command Association in Australia, Sunnyfield Disability Services and the Australian American Association Canberra Division. He is the chair of the Canberra Symphony Orchestra.

Houston is a member of the senior advisory group of the Indonesia-Australia Defence Alumni Association (IKAHAN).

Personal life
Houston and his wife Liz, who is a teacher, have three sons.

In July 2010, while CDF, Houston took medical leave to deal with prostate issues.

Honours and awards

Scholastic

 Chancellor, visitor, governor, rector and fellowships

Honorary degrees

References

|-

|-

|-

1947 births
Scottish military personnel
Graduates of the Royal College of Defence Studies
Australian aviators
Australian recipients of the Air Force Cross (United Kingdom)
Chiefs of the Defence Force (Australia)
Commanders of the Legion of Merit
Commanders of the Order of Orange-Nassau
Commandeurs of the Légion d'honneur
Knights of the Order of Australia
Foreign recipients of the Legion of Merit
Living people
Royal Australian Air Force air marshals
People educated at Strathallan School
People from Ayrshire
Recipients of the Centenary Medal
Recipients of the Darjah Utama Bakti Cemerlang (Tentera)
Recipients of the Order of Timor-Leste
Recipients of the Pingat Jasa Gemilang (Tentera)
Scottish airmen
Scottish emigrants to Australia
Chancellors by university in Australia